Investment control or investment controlling is a monitoring function within the asset management, portfolio management or investment management. It is concerned with independently supervising and monitoring the quality of asset management accounts with the aim of ensuring performance and quality in order to provide the required benefit for the asset management client. Dependent on setup, investment controlling not only encompasses controlling activities but also can include areas from compliance to performance review. Investment controlling aspects can also be taken into consideration by asset management clients or investment advisers/consultants and consequently it is likely that these stakeholders also run certain investment controlling activities.

Introduction and overview 
Efficient and appropriate management information on the quality of their discretionary managed portfolios is very important for an asset management company. Without decision-oriented information on the quality or performance of its products and/or asset managers for an asset management company it is very difficult to stand the increasing challenges of the asset management industry (increasing regulations, need for sophisticated risk management, etc.). Clients and consultants have similar needs where these often correspond to the asset manager ones some years ago. Investment controlling deals with such needs and helps to overcome the information gaps within asset management.

Investment controlling is an area of activity that is part of the overall controlling process within the asset management and is an important component of the recurring investment decision making process. From an asset management company point of view, in general investment controlling is defined as information management that gathers, processes, checks and distributes information necessary to meet the overall objectives of the asset management company. In this respect the investment controlling objective consists in configuring the infrastructure – particularly within the framework of the investment decision making process – in such a way that the processes (e.g. forecasting, decision making and implementation), the quality and the results (e.g. returns), the risks (e.g. of using derivatives) and the costs become more transparent and comprehensible. Considering the client perspective, in the following investment controlling is in general defined as independent monitoring of the performance of asset management products and/or accounts with the aim of ensuring that the client gets what was promised in the first place with respect to quality and performance.

As part of the overall investment decision making process investment controlling intents to visualise the contributions of the individual decisions of the investment process, especially with respect to return and risk, and to allocate the contributions to the responsible decision makers. The results and conclusions of the different investment controlling activities are important feedback and input into the investment process to enhance the quality or performance of the specific asset management product.

Objectives 

Form a general point of view investment controlling adds to the visibility, transparency and credibility of any asset management company. In detail investment controlling helps
 implementing best practice in performance measurement and performance presentation, for example by implementing the GIPS Standards,
 producing an independent performance analysis of the asset management accounts and/or products,
 enabling deep level analysis which is necessary to identify the real drivers of the account return and account risk and this from an ex-post as well as from an ex-ante point of view,
 monitoring risk and return of accounts and/or products against their designated benchmark and objectives, capturing performance dispersion,
 reducing unnecessary discussions by using more objective and less subjective information during the performance review,
 creating of or increasing the transparency and comparability of the asset management products and/or accounts,
 addressing performance issues on a regular basis and not leaving them running,
 creating a basis not only for ongoing analyses but also for structural changes in the investment process,
 reducing of unintended business risks through early addressing of potential performance issues,
 and others.

Investment controlling activities 

Investment controlling is very manifold and encompasses a lot of different activities like:
 performance attribution or more precisely return attribution and/or risk attribution and this ex-post as well as ex-ante,
 market index and benchmark comparisons, composite dispersion analysis and peer group analysis with respect to the return and/or risk but also to characteristics like asset class or sector weights, duration, exposure to specific risk factors and so on,
 calculation of performance figures and statistics representing manager skills or the investment style and running style analysis,
 review of the set up of the specific asset management account with respect to benchmark, investment guidelines, transaction costs and management fees, etc.,
 product review against client expectations and best practice,
 identifying of actual and potential performance issues and highlighting the serious ones to senior management,
 suggesting remedial action to solve performance issues,
 risk decomposition and risk budgeting,
 analyzing and identifying all steps of the investment process,
 review of the investment guidelines and benchmarks,
 checking whether risk levels and limits are appropriate and
 aggregated performance reporting to senior management.

Further reading
On performance measurement and attribution:
 Carl R. Bacon (2008). Practical Portfolio Performance Measurement and Attribution. The Wiley Finance Series. John Wiley & Sons
 Andreas Bickel (2000). Moderne Performance-Analyse und Performance Presentation Standards (in German). P. Haupt
 Bruce J. Feibel (2003). Investment Performance Measurement. John Wiley and Sons
 Bernd Fischer (2001). Performanceanalyse in der Praxis (in German). Oldenbourg Wissenschaftsverlag
 Todd Jankowski and Philip Lawton (2009). Investment Performance Measurement: Evaluating and Presenting Results. John Wiley and Sons
 David Spaulding (2003). Investment performance attribution: a guide to what it is, how to calculate it, and how to use it. McGraw-Hill Professional

 Articles on investment controlling

No text books on investment controlling are available thus general literature on controlling, risk management and compliance may be considered as a substitute.
 Philippe Grégoire (2010): Performance Attribution as a Management Control System,
 Stefan Illmer (1997): Controlling im Portfolio Management (in German),
 Stefan Illmer (2000): Controlling – Eine grosse Herausforderung für das Real Estate Management (in German).

See also
 Fixed income attribution
 Investment management
 Performance attribution
 Portfolio (finance)

References

External links
 GIPS Standards
 Real Estate Information Standard
 CIPM Program

Financial risk management
Investment management
Risk analysis